Elizabeth Clark (born 26 May 1972) is a former association football player who represented New Zealand at international level.

Clark made a single appearance for Football Ferns in a 1–1 draw with Papua New Guinea on 7 November 1996.

References

1972 births
Living people
New Zealand women's international footballers
New Zealand women's association footballers
Women's association football defenders